This is a survey of the postage stamps and postal history of Penrhyn.

Penrhyn is the most remote and largest atoll of the 15 Cook Islands in the south Pacific Ocean.

First stamps
The first stamps used in Penrhyn were stamps of the Cook Islands. 

From May 1902 overprinted stamps of New Zealand were used. In 1920 and 1927, New Zealand produced omnibus issues for the several Cook Islands, each inscribed with the island's name. These were replaced by stamps of the Cook Islands in 1932.

Later issues

Stamp issues for Penrhyn resumed in 1973.

See also
Postage stamps and postal history of Aitutaki
Postage stamps and postal history of the Cook Islands
Postage stamps and postal history of Niue

References

External links

The Pacific Islands Study Circle.

Penrhyn atoll
Philately by country